Oriental Review (OR) is an online magazine that describes itself as "an international e-journal focusing on current political issues in Eurasia and beyond". It was founded in 2010.  Despite its claims of editorial independence, the website has been described as under the control of Russia's Foreign Intelligence Service (SVR).

Links to Russian intelligence 
In March 2022, it was described by the British and American governments as under the control of Russia's Foreign Intelligence Service (SVR), Russia's primary external intelligence agency, founded among other online magazines for the purpose of promoting disinformation abroad. The United States Department of the Treasury said:

According to the Atlantic Council, it has been linked to the Strategic Culture Foundation (SCF), a Russian  think tank and online magazine that is regarded as an arm of Russian state interests by critics. The website has been described as in the same online ecosystem as pro-Russian network of online media outlets Russia Insider, The Duran, Geopolitica.ru, MintPress News, the Centre for Research on Globalization, the New Eastern Outlook magazine, online news sites NewsFront, SouthFront, Moscow-based think tank Katehon, the Center for Syncretic Studies, 4pt.su, Eurasianist Archive, Fort Russ, and the Voltaire Network.

Promotion of conspiracy theories 
The Treasury accused the Russian government of promoting disinformation regarding the Russo-Ukrainian War and the 2022 Russian invasion of Ukraine, as well as promoting COVID-19 disinformation, through Oriental Review. The website has also promoted conspiracy theories surrounding the poisoning of Sergei and Yulia Skripal in Salisbury, England, by Russian agents using the novichok nerve agent. It has also promoted conspiracy theories on climate change, claiming that climate change mitigation measures are neo-Nazi in intent.

Sanctions 
Owing to its reputed links to Russian intelligence services, Oriental Review was subject to official sanctions from the American and British governments following the ongoing Russian invasion of Ukraine.

See also 
 Cyberwarfare
 International sanctions during the Russo-Ukrainian War
 List of people and organizations sanctioned during the Russo-Ukrainian War

Notes

References 

2010 establishments in Russia
Russian websites
Russian propaganda organizations
Sanctions and boycotts during the Russo-Ukrainian War
Russian entities subject to the U.S. Department of the Treasury sanctions